The Antwerp Six are a group of fashion designers who graduated from Antwerp's Royal Academy of Fine Arts between 1980–81. The press began referring to them as a group beginning in about 1990, though the designers are united mostly by origin and common experiences rather than style.

Members
Walter Van Beirendonck
Ann Demeulemeester
Dries Van Noten
 Dirk Van Saene
Dirk Bikkembergs
Marina Yee

History
The fashion collective presented a distinct, radical vision for fashion during the 1980s that established Antwerp as a notable location for fashion design. The breakthrough occurred in 1986 as the group rented a truck and set out for the London Fashion Week with their collections.

Martin Margiela, another Belgian contemporary, was not actually part of the group that showed in London, although he is often mistakenly described as one of the Antwerp Six because he also emerged from the Antwerp scene immediately before the "Antwerp six" came to being. He subsequently moved to Paris, initially working for Jean Paul Gaultier and then opening his own label.

References

External links
 Fashion in Antwerp " from the Antwerp tourism office
A Rare Reunion for the ‘Antwerp Six’- NYT JUNE 17, 2013

Antwerp Six
Antwerp Six
Royal Academy of Fine Arts (Antwerp) alumni